Adolph Holton Ziegler (December 20, 1889 – May 17, 1972) was an American lawyer and politician.

Born in Easton, Maryland, Ziegler studied law in Easton and then moved to Alaska Territory where he studied law and was admitted to the Alaska bar. During World War I, Ziegler served in the United States Navy and was in the intelligence service. In 1919, he moved to Ketchikan, Alaska and owned the Ziegler House (Ketchikan, Alaska). In 1929, 1931 to 1935, Ziegler served in the Alaska Territorial House of Representatives and in 1938 and 1939 was mayor of Ketchikan, Alaska. He also served on the Alaska Territorial Board of Education from 1935 until 1959. His son was Bob Ziegler, who served in the Alaska Territorial and State Legislatures. Ziegler died in a hospital in Seattle, Washington.

References

External links
 A. H. Ziegler at 100 Years of Alaska's Legislature

1889 births
1972 deaths
Alaska Democrats
Alaska lawyers
United States Navy personnel of World War I
Mayors of places in Alaska
Members of the Alaska Territorial Legislature
People from Easton, Maryland
People from Ketchikan, Alaska
School board members in Alaska
20th-century American politicians
20th-century American lawyers